Boustead Holdings Berhad (BHB) is a Malaysian corporation with over 16,000 employees across more than 80 listed and non-listed companies in Malaysia, Indonesia and the United Kingdom. It is an affiliate of the Malaysian military.

BHB was founded in 1828 as Boustead & Co in Singapore by Edward Boustead, an English businessman. The company was incorporated in 1961, and is currently listed on the Kuala Lumpur stock exchanges.

History
In 1975, Boustead & Co split into four entities: Boustead Plc in London (which was later reorganized as Boustead & Co), Boustead Holdings Berhad (BHB) in Malaysia, Boustead Singapore Limited, and Boustead China Co, Ltd.

The major shareholder of BHB is Malaysian military pension fund, Lembaga Tabung Angkatan Tentera (LTAT).

Organisation 
The Group’s business interests are focused in key sectors of the Malaysian economy via its five Divisions:

Plantation 
The Division has 44 oil palm estates and 10 oil mills in Malaysia and undertake the full range of oil palm operations from planting, replanting, harvesting of fresh fruit bunches and producing crude palm oil and palm kernels. Our total land bank is approximately 98200 hectares with total under cultivation of 73,500 hectares.

Property & Industrial 
The Division engages primarily in property development and investment, hotel management (under the Royale Chulan hotel chain), project management as well as manufacture and distribution of cellulose fibre cement products.

Pharmaceutical 
The Division is the largest listed pharmaceutical group in Malaysia and involved in various segments of the pharmaceutical value chain, from research and development to the manufacturing of generic drugs, over-the-counter medicines and nutraceuticals, logistics and distribution, regulatory, sales and marketing as well as retail pharmacy.

Heavy Industries 
The Division caters to the defence security, marine and aerospace sectors, providing a range of services to Government and commercial clients including shipbuilding, ship repair, maintenance, repair and overhaul (MRO), manufacturing of components and systems, maritime training and integrated logistics support, among others.

Trading, Finance & Investment 
Under this Division, Boustead is involved in diverse sectors within the Malaysian economy with core businesses include a home-grown retail petroleum network, the provision of financial products and solutions as well as travel and tourism related services.

Subsidiaries 
Its major subsidiaries include Affin Bank, Pharmaniaga, and BH Petrol.

Its subsidiary Pharmaniaga was appointed as the distributor of Sinovac COVID-19 vaccine for the Malaysian market during the COVID-19 pandemic.

Boustead also operates The Curve mall in Damansara, Selangor, and MyTown Shopping Centre at Jalan Cochrane, Maluri, Kuala Lumpur. Both malls are connected to an IKEA store.

References

External links

1828 establishments in British Malaya
Conglomerate companies of Malaysia
Companies based in Kuala Lumpur
Companies listed on Bursa Malaysia
Government-owned companies of Malaysia
Armed Forces Fund Board